Bjørnsjøen is a lake in Nordmarka in Oslo, Norway. The cabin Kikutstua, owned by the Association for the Promotion of Skiing, is located at the northeastern shore of the lake. Asbjørnsen's story "En Nat i Nordmarken" is set at Bjørnsjøen.

Bjørnsjøen drains through the river Bjørnsjøelva to the lake Skjærsjøen.

Gallery

References

Lakes of Oslo